Sustenance can refer to any means of subsistence or livelihood.
 food
 any subsistence economy: see list of subsistence techniques
 hunting-gathering
 animal husbandry
 subsistence agriculture
 Any agricultural and natural resources

See also
 Economy

Resource economics